Zhomart Yerzhan (born 10 June 1993) is a Kazakh Light flyweight amateur boxer.

He won the bronze medal at the 2017 AIBA World Boxing Championships in the Light flyweight category.

References

Living people
Kazakhstani male boxers
AIBA World Boxing Championships medalists
1993 births
Universiade bronze medalists for Kazakhstan
Universiade medalists in boxing
Light-flyweight boxers
Medalists at the 2013 Summer Universiade
People from Shymkent
21st-century Kazakhstani people